Betty Irabor is a Nigerian columnist, philanthropist, writer, publisher and founder of Genevieve magazine. She previously had a column in Black & Beauty magazine in the United Kingdom. She also has a foundation that promotes breast cancer awareness, early detection and treatment.

Career
Irabor studied English in university and then ventured into publishing. She worked as a journalist at Concord Newspapers, took freelance writing jobs at the Vanguard, The Guardian, This Day as well as Black & Beauty magazine and others abroad. She later ventured into telecommunications.

In 2003 she founded the glossy magazine Genevieve Magazine, which has been described as "Nigeria's leading inspirational and lifestyle magazine". It is headquartered in Lekki, with a staff of fourteen.  Ten issues are published each year. The magazine website focuses on celebrity news. Irabor is the editor-in-chief and chief executive officer.

In 2018 her memoir Dust to Dew was published.  In it she chronicles her struggles with depression.

She is also a philanthropist, public speaker and champion for breast cancer awareness with her nonprofit known as the Genevieve PinkBall Foundation.

She is also the host and presenter of Life's Lessons with Betty Irabor. She is a speaker and ambassador who shares promotional and modeling shots.

Personal life
Irabor was born on March 25, 1957, and raised in Nigeria. She's married to Soni Irabor and they have two children. Their son made a short film that was selected by the Zanzibar International Film Festival.

Award and honors

Irabor was honored by the Association of Professional Women Bankers as The Most Accomplished Female Publisher in Nigeria 2011.

References

Year of birth missing (living people)
Living people
Nigerian writers
Nigerian women writers